Geoff Bodine Racing (also known as GEB Racing) was a  NASCAR Winston Cup and Craftsman Truck Series team. It was owned and operated by former NASCAR driver Geoffrey Bodine following his purchase of the estate of Alan Kulwicki. He remained owner of the team until the 1998 season, when he sold the operation to Jim Mattei and John Porter. Through the chain of succession, the team's final owner was Robby Gordon.

Winston Cup 
In 1993 Bodine, who was driving for Bud Moore Engineering at the time, decided to become an owner-driver. Earlier in the season, then-defending Winston Cup Champion Alan Kulwicki, who owned and drove for AK Racing, was killed in a plane crash as the Cup Series made its spring trip to Bristol.

Bodine was able to raise enough money to purchase the assets of Kulwicki’s former team from its caretaker, Felix Sabates, who had been providing financial backing so the team could continue running. However, he immediately ran into a problem as Kulwicki’s sponsor, Hooters, pulled out of the team immediately after Bodine took ownership. Undaunted, Bodine signed The Family Channel to be the sponsor for the remainder of the season. After The Family Channel moved over to Roush Racing for the next year, Bodine got Exide Batteries to sponsor his effort in 1994. Bodine won three times that year but finished 17th in points. He also won the 1994 Winston All-Star Race, earning the $1,000,000 prize. He almost won the inaugural running of the Brickyard 400 before he got into a controversial incident with younger brother Brett Bodine where Brett wrecked Geoff out of the lead; Geoff responded by publicly announcing to the press that he and Brett were feuding in their personal lives. Two weeks later, Geoff's wife moved out of the house and filed for divorce, resulting in a downward spiral for Bodine. Later that year, Geoff won at North Wilkesboro which was the last time the race winner lapped the entire field. Bodine improved one spot better in 1995, although he struggled in several races and went winless. Bodine would later publicly admit that his ongoing divorce was impacting his ability to drive competitively and made several changes to the racing operations.

In 1996, after Exide moved to Roush, Bodine ran with QVC sponsorship and scored his final win at Watkins Glen International Raceway. He struggled in 1997, failing to qualify in a couple of races, and having his brother Todd fill in for him at the Coca-Cola 600. Despite this, he won two poles in the last two months of the season, including one that broke the track record at Atlanta Motor Speedway.

In 1998, he sold part of his ownership to Mattei and Porter, and picked up sponsorship from Philips. When Bodine got an offer to drive for Joe Bessey in 1999, he sold the rest of his team and was replaced by Michael Waltrip, as the team switched to Chevrolet. Finishing 5th in the Daytona 500, Waltrip finished the year 29th in points. Getting sponsorship from NationsRent in 2000, Waltrip's only top-ten finish that year was a 3rd at Martinsville. He left at the end of the year for Dale Earnhardt, Inc. and Mike Wallace took over, while the team switched back to Ford. During the 2000 season, the team was sold to Ultra Motorsports.

Craftsman Truck Series 
Bodine Racing began racing in the new Truck Series in 1995, when Bodine drove ten races in the No. 7, with Exide sponsorship. He shared the ride with Dave Rezendes, who raced eleven times that season; together, they combined for fourteen top-ten finishes. Bodine's son Barry drove the No. 07 Tanya Tucker Salsa truck at Martinsville, but he crashed out. Rezendes raced the No. 7 full-time in 1996 NASCAR Craftsman Truck Series with QVC sponsoring, and he responded with three victories and a sixth-place finish in points. Bodine and Barry drove the 07 in six races, but only had one pole and top-ten.

Due to a lack of sponsorship, Rezendes was let go after two races in 1997. Tammy Jo Kirk took his place with Loveable sponsorship, becoming the first full-time female driver on the circuit. She had a best finish of 11th, but was let go late in the season, and Barry Bodine finished out the season. The team closed in 1998 due to a lack of sponsorship.

References

External links 
Geoff Bodine owner stats
Jim Mattei owner stats

1993 establishments in North Carolina
Companies based in North Carolina
Defunct NASCAR teams
Defunct companies based in North Carolina
2000 disestablishments in North Carolina
Bodine family